Nimishaben Manharsinh Suthar is an Indian politician from Bharatiya Janata Party. In May 2021, she was elected as a member of the Gujarat Legislative Assembly from Morva Hadaf (constituency). She defeated Suresh Katara of Indian National Congress by 45,649 votes in 2021 By-elections.

References 

Living people
Year of birth missing (living people)
21st-century Indian politicians
People from Panchmahal district
Bharatiya Janata Party politicians from Gujarat
Gujarat MLAs 2017–2022
Women in Gujarat politics
21st-century Indian women politicians